Woody Evans is an American librarian and author of short stories and nonfiction works, who is known for critical commentary on technology, technoculture, and transhumanism. He has written for Rain Taxi, Boing Boing, Juked, Blunderbuss Magazine, was a Library Journal columnist in 2007, and is a frequent contributor to Information Today publications.  His books and articles are referenced in Library and Information Science courses.

Partial bibliography

Fiction
 Bastard Sword. Split Lip Magazine, 2016.
 Sirius Numb. Blunderbuss Magazine, 2016.
 Pashtun Probs. Blip Magazine, 2012.
 Eyes Only. TRNSFR, 2011
 The Devil Plus Russians. Primal, 1999.

Poetry
 Locusts Throng the Corn. Tanka Journal, 2016
 The Dowager's Goat. Haiku Journal, 2013
 Buildup. Juked, 2004

Nonfiction
 Them Skulls. Star 82 Review, 2018.
 Cyberspace is the Child of the Industrial Age – Defining it as Independent is Nonsense. Institute for Ethics and Emerging Technologies, 2016.
 Against Transhuman Separatism. Institute for Ethics and Emerging Technologies, 2016.
 Librarians Need Global Credentials. Library Journal. 2016: 54. 1 April.
 FreakAngels. Rain Taxi Review of Books, 2012.
 Outside the Gold Ring: Notes from the First Ever Middle East Film and Comic Con. Motherboard, 2012.
 The Social Web and Civil Life. Searcher, 2009

Books
 Building Library 3.0. Chandos, 2009.
 Information Dynamics in Virtual Worlds. Chandos, 2011
 The Future We Deserve. (Contributor). 2011.
 Full list of works (?)

References

External links
ALA vs. NSA: Reflecting on Libraries and Social Media
Building Between Dimensions: An Interview with Sophia Vyzoviti
"Tools To Not Die With: An Interview with Vinay Gupta" at Boing Boing
Publications

American male essayists
American essayists
Writers from Mississippi
American librarians
1971 births
Living people
American fiction writers
University of Southern Mississippi alumni